The Pyhäjoki (literally: "sacred river") is a river in Northern Ostrobothnia, Finland.

The river originates in Lake Pyhäjärvi and flows generally north-northwest through the Pyhäjokilaakso basin, a lightly settled region in southwest Northern Ostrobothnia. Towns along its course are Kärsämäki, Haapavesi and Oulainen. It empties into the Gulf of Bothnia at the town of Pyhäjoki, dividing into two branches shortly beforehand.

The river has rapids and is used for rafting. Timber was formerly rafted down it, but like the other short rivers in the region, it could not support a major sawmill industry at its mouth. In 1979 the river still had a salmon run, but numbers declined and in 1993 the river was included in a salmon action plan (SAP) under which fry were introduced from the Torne.

The element pyhä-, meaning "sacred", in the name of the river and of the lake where it originates, stems from Finnish paganism.

References

External links

Further reading

 Keijo Juntunen, Juha Paso and Erkki Jokikokko. Lohi nousee Simojokeen, Kuivajokeen, Kiiminkijokeen ja Pyhäjokeen: tuloksia ja päätelmiä vuosien 1999–2000 seurannoista (Salmon recovery in the Simojoki, Kuivajoki, Kiiminkijoki and Pyhäjoki – monitoring results and conclusions 1999–2000). Kala- ja riistaraportteja 221. Helsinki/Oulu: Riista- ja kalatalouden tutkimuslaitos, 2001.  

Rivers of Finland
Oulainen
Merijärvi
Pyhäjoki
Haapavesi
Landforms of North Ostrobothnia